Playing My Game is the debut studio album by Norwegian singer Lene Marlin, released on 22 March 1999 by Virgin Records.

Track listing

Personnel 
Credits adapted from CD liner notes.
Musicians
 Lene Marlin – vocals (all tracks), arrangements (2, 5), guitar (7)
 Jørn Dahl – arrangements (all tracks), keyboards, piano, programming
 Bjørn Charles Dreyer – guitar (3)
 Hans G – arrangements (5)
 Wallen Mjäland – bass guitar, tambourine
 Stray – guitars (1-6, 8-10)
 Karl Oluf Wennerberg – cymbals, hi-hat, tambourine

Technical
 Jørn Dahl – production, engineering
 Hans G – production, engineering
 Espen Berg – mastering (3)
 Dan Bierton – engineering
 Ian Cooper – mastering (1, 2, 4-10)
 Richard Lowe – engineering
 Erik Stokke – engineering (2, 6-8)

Design
 Mikio Ariga – photography
 Gry Celius – hairstyling
 Masaaki Fukushi – artwork

Charts

Weekly charts

Year-end charts

Certifications

References

1999 debut albums
Lene Marlin albums
Virgin Records albums